This is a list of football games played by the Netherlands national football team between 1980 and 1999.

1980s

1990

1991

1992

1993

1994

1995

1996

1997

1998

1999

See also
Netherlands national football team results

1989–90 in Dutch football
1990–91 in Dutch football
1990s in the Netherlands
1991–92 in Dutch football
1992–93 in Dutch football
1993–94 in Dutch football
1994–95 in Dutch football
1995–96 in Dutch football
1996–97 in Dutch football
1997–98 in Dutch football
1998–99 in Dutch football
1999–2000 in Dutch football
1990